The UCI Track Cycling World Championships – Men's elimination, colloquially known as the Devil is the men's world championship elimination race event held annually at the UCI Track Cycling World Championships. The event was first introduced in 2021 and is the most recent addition to the program, having proved very popular as the penultimate section of the omnium.

Medalists

Medal table

External links
Track Cycling World Championships 2016–1893 bikecult.com
World Championship, Track, Scratch, Elite cyclingarchives.com

 
Men's elimination
Lists of UCI Track Cycling World Championships medalists